Per Svensson (born October 10, 1988) is a Swedish professional ice hockey defenceman. He is currently playing with Timrå IK of the Swedish Hockey League (SHL).

Playing career
Svensson joined Almtuna IS with the  2012-13 season. He played two games  with AIK IF in the Swedish Hockey League during the 2013–14 season.

On February 4, 2020, Svensson left Sweden to join EHC Kloten of the Swiss League (SL) for the remainder of the season. He was brought in as their third import player to provide depth for the playoffs and a potential promotion round.

References

External links

1988 births
Living people
AIK IF players
Almtuna IS players
EHC Kloten players
IK Oskarshamn players
Swedish ice hockey defencemen
Timrå IK players